The Visual Effects Society Award for Outstanding Created Environment in an Animated Feature is one of the annual awards given by the Visual Effects Society starting from 2011. The award was originally titled "Outstanding Created Environment in an Animated Feature Motion Picture", before being re-titled in 2016.

2010s
Outstanding Created Environment in an Animated Feature Motion Picture

Outstanding Created Environment in an Animated Feature

2020s

Films with Multiple Nominations

3 Nominations
 The Adventures of Tintin

2 Nominations
 Kubo and the Two Strings
 ParaNorman
 Trolls World Tour

References

E
Awards established in 2011